Construction and Building Unions Superannuation (Cbus) is one of Australia's largest public offer industry superannuation funds. Cbus is run for the benefit of its members and does not pay dividends to shareholders.

History 
Established in 1984 for the construction, building and allied industries, Cbus now has over 777,000 members with over 450 staff across three states.

Cbus has over 136,000 participating employers and manages $46.7 billion of members' funds.

Cbus also invests back into the building and construction industry through its $2.8 billion property development company Cbus Property.

Corporate governance 
United Super Pty Ltd is the Trustee of Cbus Superannuation Fund. The Directors of United Super Pty Ltd are appointed in equal number from member and employer associations in the construction and building industries. An Independent Director also sits on the board.

The current Chair of the board is former Premier of Victoria, Steve Bracks.

References

External links 
 

Companies based in Melbourne
Superannuation funds in Australia
Australian companies established in 1984